Tim Johansson is a Paralympic athlete from Sweden competing mainly in category T51 wheel chair racing events.

Johansson has competed in four Paralympics, winning medals in three of them.  His first games were in 1992 where despite competing in 5 events ranging from the 100m up to 5000m he was unable to win a medal.  He followed this up with a silver and 2 bronzes in his next games in Atlanta in 1996 in the 400m, 1500m and marathon respectively as well as competing in the 1500m.  At the 2000 Summer Paralympics he competed in the 200m, 400m, 800m and 1500m winning a bronze in the 800m.  His fourth and final games came in 2004 where he won a silver medal in the 200m as well as competing in the marathon.

References

Paralympic athletes of Sweden
Athletes (track and field) at the 1992 Summer Paralympics
Athletes (track and field) at the 1996 Summer Paralympics
Athletes (track and field) at the 2000 Summer Paralympics
Athletes (track and field) at the 2004 Summer Paralympics
Paralympic silver medalists for Sweden
Paralympic bronze medalists for Sweden
Living people
Medalists at the 1996 Summer Paralympics
Medalists at the 2000 Summer Paralympics
Medalists at the 2004 Summer Paralympics
Year of birth missing (living people)
Paralympic medalists in athletics (track and field)
20th-century Swedish people
21st-century Swedish people
Swedish wheelchair racers